Aeronautics is the second album by the German power metal band Masterplan. It's the first album to feature playing and songwriting by members Axel Mackenrott (keyboards) and Iron Savior bassist Jan S. Eckert, who both joined the band shortly after the recordings of the debut album.

The song After This War is a re-written version of Iron Savior song After The War, which is on the album Dark Assault and was written by Jan S. Eckert and Piet Sielck.

Track listing
All songs were written by Masterplan, except where noted.

Line-up 
 Jørn Lande – vocals
 Roland Grapow – guitar
 Jan S. Eckert – bass
 Axel Mackenrott – keyboards
 Uli Kusch – drums

Credits 
 Produced by Andy Sneap and Masterplan
 Recorded by Andy Sneap and Roland Grapow at Crazy Cat Studio, Hamburg (GER)
 Mixed by Mikko Karmila at Finnvox Studio, Helsinki (FIN)
 Mastered by Mika Jussila at Finnvox Studio, Helsinki (FIN)
 Bandphotos by Dirk Schelpmeier
 Layout & Album cover by Thomas Ewerhard

References 

2005 albums
AFM Records albums
Masterplan (band) albums
Albums produced by Andy Sneap